USS Superior (AM-311) was a steel-hulled Admirable-class minesweeper built for the U.S. Navy in 1944. Superior participated in the final struggle in the Pacific Ocean against the Empire of Japan during the end of World War II and remained behind, after the war ended, to clear minefields laid during the war.

Superior was laid down on 18 February 1944 by Associated Shipbuilders, Seattle, Washington, launched on 11 May 1944, sponsored by Mrs. L. H. Lyon; and commissioned on 1 November 1944.

World War II Pacific Theatre operations

Superior completed fitting out at Seattle, Washington, and then  moved down the coast to San Pedro, California, for her shakedown cruise,  and then on to San Diego, California,  for sound training. She returned to San Pedro on 26 December 1944, and sailed from there, on 3 January 1945, for Hawaii. The minesweeper arrived there ten days later and sailed for Eniwetok on 19 January, as a convoy escort. She returned to Pearl Harbor and escorted another convoy EUK-19, to Eniwetok.

Superior stood out of Eniwetok on 3 March, en route to Ulithi where she and Mine Group 2 (MinGru 2) completed final staging for the Ryukyu Islands operation. Superior began sweeping mines off Kerama Retto on 25 March. She remained at Okinawa, clearing mines and performing patrol duty until 5 May when she sailed for Ulithi. Superior joined another Okinawa-bound convoy and escorted it there on 27 May. She operated from Kerama Retto for the next several months, sweeping mines in the East China Sea.

Post-War operations

In September, Superior aided in clearing Sasebo Bay and the Tsushima Strait area. The following month she swept the Higashi Channel area off Kyūshū. The ship cleared Sasebo on 10 December 1945 en route to the United States, via Eniwetok and Pearl Harbor.

Post-War Deactivation 

Superior arrived at San Diego, California, on 12 January 1946 and sailed for Galveston, Texas, the following week. She arrived there on 3 February and was ordered inactivated. The minesweeper moved to Orange, Texas, on 22 May and joined the 16th Fleet in commission, in reserve. In February 1947 her status was changed to out of commission, in reserve. Superior was reclassified as a steel-hulled fleet minesweeper, MSF-311, on 7 February 1955. She was struck from the Navy list on 1 July 1972.

Awards 

Superior received three battle stars for World War II service.

References

External links
 NavSource Online: Mine Warfare Vessel Photo Archive - Superior (MSF 311) - ex-AM-311

Admirable-class minesweepers
Ships built in Seattle
1944 ships
World War II minesweepers of the United States